The Nichkesaisk or Nichkesai Formation is an early Campanian geologic formation in Kyrgyzstan. Fossil dinosaur eggs have been reported from the formation.

See also 
 List of dinosaur-bearing rock formations
 List of stratigraphic units with dinosaur trace fossils
 Dinosaur eggs

References

Bibliography

Further reading 
 L. A. Nessov. 1995. Dinozavri severnoi Yevrazii: Novye dannye o sostave kompleksov, ekologii i paleobiogeografii [Dinosaurs of northern Eurasia: new data about assemblages, ecology, and paleobiogeography]. Institute for Scientific Research on the Earth's Crust, St. Petersburg State University, St. Petersburg 1-156

Geologic formations of Kyrgyzstan
Upper Cretaceous Series of Asia
Campanian Stage
Shale formations
Ooliferous formations
Paleontology in Kyrgyzstan
Formations